Edith Ann Pearlman (née Grossman; June 26, 1936 – January 1, 2023) was an American short story writer.

Early life and career
Pearlman was born in Providence, Rhode Island, where she grew up in a middle-class Jewish neighborhood, the daughter of Edna (Rosen) and Herman Paul Grossman, an ophthalmologist. Her father was born in Ukraine, and her maternal grandparents emigrated from Poland. She graduated from Radcliffe College. She has worked in a computer firm and a soup kitchen and has served in the Town Meeting of Brookline, Massachusetts.

Her non-fiction has appeared in The Atlantic Monthly, Smithsonian Magazine, Preservation, and Ploughshares. Her travel writing – about the Cotswolds, Budapest, Jerusalem, Paris, and Tokyo – has been published in The New York Times and elsewhere.

In January 2015, her fifth collection of short stories, Honeydew, was chosen as one of Oprah Winfrey's 'top 19 books to read right now'.

Personal life and death
Pearlman lived in Brookline, Massachusetts, with her husband. They had two children.

Pearlman died in Brookline on January 1, 2023, at the age of 86.

Awards and honors
Source:

2014 Jewish Quarterly-Wingate Prize, shortlist, Binocular Vision
2012 National Book Critics Circle Award, Binocular Vision
2011 Edward Lewis Wallant Award, Binocular Vision
2011 PEN/Malamud Award 
2011 National Book Award for Fiction, finalist, Binocular Vision
2008 Pushcart Prize XXXIII, "Door Psalm"
2006 Best American Short Stories 2006, "Self-Reliance" 
2003 The PEN/O. Henry Prize Stories, "The Story"
2001 Pushcart Prize XXV, "Mates"
2000 Best American Short Stories 2000, "Allog"
1999 The Antioch Review Distinguished Fiction Award
1998 Best American Short Stories 1998, "Chance"
1991 Syndicated Fiction Award (from NEA)
1987 Syndicated Fiction Award
1984 The PEN/O. Henry Prize Stories, "Conveniences"
1978 The PEN/O. Henry Prize Stories, "Hanging Fire"

Works

Short story collections
 Winner of the Drue Heinz Literature Prize
 Winner of Spokane Prize for Literature
 Winner of Mary McCarthy Prize

Anthologies

References

External links

Trove
Commentary Magazine

1936 births
2023 deaths
American women short story writers
Radcliffe College alumni
PEN/Malamud Award winners
Lincoln School (Providence, Rhode Island) alumni
Jewish American non-fiction writers
Jewish American short story writers
American women travel writers
20th-century American women writers
20th-century American non-fiction writers
20th-century American short story writers
21st-century American women writers
21st-century American non-fiction writers
21st-century American short story writers
American travel writers
Writers from Providence, Rhode Island
Writers from Brookline, Massachusetts